Julia Nobis is an Australian fashion model and a bachelor of science & applied science student at RMIT. She is considered an "Industry Icon" by models.com and a supermodel by Vogue. She has been on the cover of Vogue Italia six times.

Career
Nobis was discovered in 2009 and debuted as a Calvin Klein exclusive in 2010. In the ensuing season, she walked for brands such as  Chanel, Dior, Burberry, Balenciaga, Valentino, Versace, Yves Saint Laurent, Tory Burch, Marni, Salvatore Ferragamo, Céline, and notably closed Prada. Other brands she has walked for include Fendi, Emilio Pucci, Tommy Hilfiger, Sacai, Paco Rabanne, Michael Kors, Lacoste, Jason Wu, Haider Ackermann, Dries van Noten, Alexander Wang, Acne Studios, and Gucci among many others.

She has been in ads for Louis Vuitton, Prada, Marc Jacobs, Dior, Calvin Klein, Valentino, Jil Sander, Proenza Schouler, Balenciaga, Lanvin, Sacai, Céline, Yves Saint Laurent, Alberta Ferretti and Givenchy among others.

At the peak of her career she was in the Top 3 on Models.com's Top 50 Models ranking.

Nobis is currently studying toward a bachelor of science and applied science at RMIT. She aspires to eventually become an ER doctor saying:"Modelling was never my end goal. I get paid to study basically. I get paid better than your average uni student that's for sure. I kind of fell into modelling and stuck with it."

References 

Living people
Australian female models
Models from Sydney
1992 births